The 2016–17 Carolina Hurricanes season was the 38th season for the National Hockey League (NHL) franchise that was established on June 22, 1979 (following seven seasons of play in the World Hockey Association), and 19th season since the franchise relocated from Hartford to start the 1997–98 NHL season. The Canes failed to make the playoffs for the eighth consecutive season.

Standings

Schedule and results

Pre-season

Regular season

Player stats 
As of April 9, 2017

Skaters

Goaltenders

†Denotes player spent time with another team before joining the Hurricanes. Stats reflect time with the Hurricanes only.
‡Denotes player was traded mid-season. Stats reflect time with the Hurricanes only.
Bold/italics denotes franchise record.

Transactions 

The Hurricanes have been involved in the following transactions during the 2016–17 season.

Trades

Notes

Free agents acquired

Free agents lost

Claimed via waivers

Lost via waivers

Lost via retirement

Players released

Player signings

Draft picks

Below are the Carolina Hurricanes' selections at the 2016 NHL Entry Draft, was held June 24–25, 2016, at the First Niagara Center in Buffalo, New York.

Draft notes

 The Los Angeles Kings' first-round pick went to the Carolina Hurricanes as the result of a trade on February 25, 2015, that sent Andrej Sekera to Los Angeles in exchange for Roland McKeown and this pick (being conditional at the time of the trade). The condition – Carolina will receive a first-round pick in 2016 if Los Angeles fails to qualify for the 2015 Stanley Cup playoffs – was converted on April 9, 2015.
 The Winnipeg Jets' third round pick went to the Carolina Hurricanes as the result of a trade on February 25, 2015, that sent Jiri Tlusty to Winnipeg in exchange for a conditional sixth-round pick in 2015 and this pick.
 The Boston Bruins' third-round pick went to the Carolina Hurricanes as the result of a trade on February 29, 2016, that sent John-Michael Liles to Boston in exchange for Anthony Camara, a fifth-round pick in 2017 and this pick.
 The Carolina Hurricanes' seventh-round pick went to the Vancouver Canucks as the result of a trade on June 27, 2015, that sent Eddie Lack to Carolina in exchange for a third-round pick in 2015 and this pick.

References

Carolina Hurricanes seasons
Carolina Hurricanes
2016 in sports in North Carolina
2017 in sports in North Carolina